was a Japanese video game developer founded in 1985. They were best known for their PlayStation-era snowboarding games, though they also released titles for PlayStation 2, Dreamcast, Neo Geo Pocket, and arcade.

History
UEP Systems' most critically acclaimed title is 1997's Cool Boarders 2 for the PlayStation, an early pioneering title of the "action sports" video game genre. The studio's biggest creative release was the quirky 3D action/adventure title Rising Zan: The Samurai Gunman, the studio's only non-sports game, which received sub-par reviews but gained a small amount of cult appeal among gamers at the time. Despite the success of their early snowboarding titles, UEP struggled financially in the years that followed with a series of commercially unsuccessful games. After the release of Cool Boarders: Code Alien - another poor seller - for the PlayStation 2 in 2000, the studio disbanded in 2001.

Games developed

References

External links
 

Japanese companies disestablished in 2001
Software companies based in Tokyo
Video game companies established in 1985
Video game companies disestablished in 2001
Defunct video game companies of Japan
Video game development companies
Japanese companies established in 1985